Yunnanilus forkicaudalis is a species of stone loach which is endemic to China. Its type locality is Lunan County, Heilongtan in Yunnan. Some authorities consider Y. forkicaudalis to be a junior synonym of Yunnanilus macrositanus.

References

F
Taxa named by Li Wie-Xian
Fish described in 1991